Helmut Kremers (born 24 March 1949) is a German former professional footballer who played as a full-back. His twin brother, Erwin Kremers, also played as a German international with the two brothers playing with each other regularly. Helmut and Erwin Kremers are the first ever twins to play in the Bundesliga.

Club career
Moving up to the Bundesliga squad of Borussia Mönchengladbach in 1967, Helmut Kremers won his first of two DFB-Pokal trophies with then lower league side Kickers Offenbach in 1970. In 1972, he had joined FC Schalke 04 together with his twin brother Erwin in 1971, he was able to lift the trophy for a second time. Unlike his twin brother, who played winger, full back Helmut had spells with other clubs after the end of his deal with Schalke, playing for Rot-Weiss Essen in the 1980–81 2. Bundesliga and for North American Soccer League team Calgary Boomers in 1981. In total, Kremers scored 50 goals in 273 Bundesliga appearances. Together, the twin brothers made three appearances in the national team: 1973 in Hanover against Austria (4-0) and in Gelsenkirchen against France (2-1) and in 1974 against Hungary in a 5-0 win in Dortmund. In 1974 he became FIFA World Cup champion with Germany in his own country but was never used. Nevertheless, like all members of the squad of the German World Cup team, he received the Silver Laurel Leaf on 23 September 1974. In the fall of 1981, he joined the Memphis Americans of the Major Indoor Soccer League for one season. In 1982/83 he put on his football boots again as player-coach of SV 08 Kuppenheim in the Oberliga Baden-Württemberg and succeeded Heinz Stickel in this office.

International career
Kremers played in eight games for his country, the last time on 12 March 1975, in a friendly defeat at the hands of England. Although playing on less occasions for West Germany than his twin brother (who won 15 caps), Kremers was part of the 1974 FIFA World Cup winning squad. Erwin Kremers missed out on that due to a disciplinary decision taken beforehand.

Honours
 DFB-Pokal winner 1970 with Kickers Offenbach
 DFB-Pokal winner 1972 with FC Schalke 04
 FIFA World Cup Champion 1974 (without action)

After career
Kremers was FC Schalke 04 manager three times between 1989 and 1993, interim coach in 1989 and from 12 September to 6 December 1994 the last president to date. The sentence he said at the general meeting became legendary: “When we used to play against Dortmund, we didn’t even change our clothes.” After his term of office, the presidency was replaced by a change in the statutes by a board appointed by the supervisory board, which was then headed by Gerhard Rehberg. In December 2011 he ran for the office of President of MSV Duisburg but was not elected.

Today Kremers is managing director of a GmbH for project development in Duisburg, which he founded in 1992.

Miscellaneous
Kremers completed an apprenticeship as a wholesale merchant. In a portrait in May 1974, he was described as a "reasonable person", as a "pragmatist", "more Hanseatic cool than Rhenish cheerful nature" and as a person "between naturalness and well-concealed arrogance". Together with his twin brother Erwin, he reached 44th place in the German hit parade in 1974 as "Die Kremers" with the title The Girl of My Dreams. The two Kremers brothers lived under the same roof with their families during their careers, and they also owned a discotheque together. During his career, Helmut Kremers spoke out in favour of the abolition of transfer fees when changing clubs, since this was "a kind of human trafficking".

Literature
 Christian Karn, Reinhard Rehberg: Encyclopedia of German League Football. Player Encyclopedia 1963–1994. AGON Sportverlag, Kassel 2012. , page 279.
 Fritz Tauber: German national football player. Player statistics from A to Z. AGON Sportverlag, Kassel 2012, page 69.

References

External links
 
 
 

1949 births
Living people
Sportspeople from Mönchengladbach
1974 FIFA World Cup players
Borussia Mönchengladbach players
Calgary Boomers players
Expatriate soccer players in Canada
Expatriate soccer players in the United States
FIFA World Cup-winning players
Bundesliga players
2. Bundesliga players
Association football defenders
German footballers
Germany international footballers
Germany B international footballers
Kickers Offenbach players
Major Indoor Soccer League (1978–1992) players
Memphis Americans players
North American Soccer League (1968–1984) players
Rot-Weiss Essen players
FC Schalke 04 players
German twins
West German expatriate footballers
West German expatriate sportspeople in Canada
West German expatriate sportspeople in the United States
West German footballers
Twin sportspeople
Footballers from North Rhine-Westphalia